Bhalot is a village in Mirpur in the region of Azad Kashmir some 45 mi (or 72 km) South-East of Islamabad, the capital city of Pakistan. In addition to Bhalot Mirpur there is also a Bhalot Dadyal and Bhalot Shera. The village itself is near the sector B5 district of Mirpur called Khambal. It is reported that the Bhalot villages have migrated from Gujrat District, Punjab. The people of this village are Gujjars from the Khatana clan.

References

Villages in Pakistan